Chao Feng Wu (born October 19, 1980), also known as Ken Wu, is an American community leader based in Los Angeles area and proponent of Taiwan Independence movement.  

He is the chapter president of Formosan Association for Public Affairs(FAPA) Los Angeles Chapter and chipo(branch) head of World United Formosans for Independence or WUFI, an organization promoting Taiwan independence. Wu is the secretary-general of Taiwan Center Foundation of Greater Los Angeles, who also serves as the foundation's board member and is the chairman of Taiwanese American Heritage Week Committee of Greater Los Angeles for the years 2017 and 2018. 

Wu also serves as an executive committee member of the Democratic Progressive Party US West Chapter and due to his many involvements in the overseas Taiwanese community, he also serves as an Overseas Community Affairs Council advisor for the Los Angeles area.

Early life 
Wu was born in Monga District of Taipei, Taiwan and attended Taipei Dong Yuan Elementary School in Taipei until he emigrated to Seattle, Washington, USA at age ten. Wu attended Eckstein Middle School and Roosevelt High School in Seattle and finished his high school studies at Monta Vista High School in Cupertino, California. He graduated from UCLA in 2003 where he completed his studies in Economics and Public Policy. 

At UCLA, he directed and produced the stage play Typhoon Night when he served as the director of Taiwanese American Union (TAU)'s Taiwanese Culture Night (TCN).

Career 
Wu decided to pursue a professional career in banking and investments for a major American bank after college before he became more involved in Taiwanese American community works.

Wu believes the naturally independent"(天然獨) generation are more supportive of Taiwan independence and are more willing to sacrifice for their nation for they just want to have a Taiwanese nation for the people of Taiwan. Wu sees the greatest challenge of Taiwan independence movement is its lack of consensus among different generations of Taiwan independence advocates. On US-Taiwan relations, Wu suggests Taiwan is not a pawn but a lead role. 

As FAPA Los Angeles chapter president, Wu organized genocide prevention events that aimed to commemorate February 28 Incident and further mutual understandings of various ethnic groups victimized by government oppression. 

Wu in the 2017 event stood with featured keynote speaker Rebiya Kadeer and openly support the independence movement for Taiwan and East Turkestan, and against Chinese government.

References

1980 births
Taiwanese emigrants to the United States
Politicians from Taipei
People from Cupertino, California
Living people
University of California, Los Angeles alumni
Taiwan independence activists
Activists from Seattle
Democratic Progressive Party (Taiwan) politicians